is a Japanese former high jumper who competed in the 1984 Summer Olympics.

References

1958 births
Living people
Japanese male high jumpers
Olympic male high jumpers
Olympic athletes of Japan
Athletes (track and field) at the 1984 Summer Olympics
Asian Games gold medalists for Japan
Asian Games bronze medalists for Japan
Asian Games gold medalists in athletics (track and field)
Asian Games medalists in athletics (track and field)
Athletes (track and field) at the 1978 Asian Games
Athletes (track and field) at the 1982 Asian Games
Medalists at the 1978 Asian Games
Medalists at the 1982 Asian Games
World Athletics Championships athletes for Japan
Japan Championships in Athletics winners
20th-century Japanese people
21st-century Japanese people